Pavle Obradović (born 4 July 2001) is a Serbian professional footballer who plays for Al-Taawon on loan from Emirates.

Career statistics

References

External links

2001 births
Living people
Association football forwards
Serbian footballers
Serbian expatriate footballers
FK Borac Čačak players
RC Strasbourg Alsace players
Emirates Club players
Al-Taawon (UAE) Club players
Serbian First League players
UAE Pro League players
UAE First Division League players
Serbian expatriate sportspeople in France
Expatriate footballers in France
Serbian expatriate sportspeople in the United Arab Emirates
Expatriate footballers in the United Arab Emirates
People from Gornji Milanovac